Harold is an English personal name. The modern name Harold ultimately derives from the Proto-Germanic *harja-waldaz, meaning 'military-power' or 'army-ruler'. The name entered Modern English via the Old English from Hereweald, which retained the same meaning and was prevalent in Anglo-Saxon England. The name's popularity in Viking Age England would also have been bolstered by the use of the Old Norse form Haraldr among Scandinavian settlers in the Danelaw.

Ancient
Chariovalda (d. 16), Batavian chieftain and Roman ally, killed near the River Weser

Medieval

 Hagrold (fl. 944–954), also known as Harold, Scandinavian chieftain in Normandy
 Harold Harefoot, or Harold I (c. 1015–1040), King of England from 1035 to 1040
 Harold Godwinson, or Harold II (c. 1022–1066), the last Anglo-Saxon king of England and Earl of Wessex
 Harold, son of Harold Godwinson (fl. 1067–1098)
 Harold of Gloucester (died 1168), supposed child martyr and saint, allegedly murdered by Jews
 Harald Fairhair (850-932), the first King of Norway
 Arioald, king of the Lombards

Modern name
Harold Abrahams, British Olympic champion sprinter and subject of Chariots of Fire
Harold Achor (1907–1967), Justice of the Indiana Supreme Court
Harold Alexander, 1st Earl Alexander of Tunis, British Army officer who served with distinction in both the First World War and the Second World War and, afterwards, as Governor General of Canada, the 17th since Canadian Confederation
Harold Arroyo, Puerto Rican boxer
Harold Bailey (gridiron football) (born 1957), American football player
Harold Walter Bailey (1899–1996), British linguist
Harold Baines (born 1959), American baseball player
Harold Baker (photographer) (1860–1942), British photographer
Harold Baker (politician) (1877–1960), British politician, Financial Secretary to the War Office 1912–1915
H. A. Baker (1881–1971), American author and Pentecostal missionary
Harold Baker (cricketer) (1884–1954), English cricketer
Shorty Baker (1914–1966), American jazz musician
Harold Baker (judge) (born 1929), federal judge on United States District Courts in Illinois
George Harold Baker (1877–1916), lawyer, political figure, and soldier from Quebec, Canada
Harold Brooks-Baker (1933–2005), American-British financier, journalist, and publisher, and self-proclaimed expert on genealogy
Harold Bekkering (born 1965), Dutch cognitive psychologist
Harold Bloom, American literary critic
Harold Budd (1936–2020), American composer and poet
Harold Craxton (1885–1971), British composer and pianist
Harold Camping (1921–2013), President of Family Radio
Hal Daub (born 1941), American politician
Harold Danko (born 1947), American jazz pianist
Harold Demsetz (1930–2019), American economist
Harold de Soysa (1907–1971), first indigenous Anglican Bishop of Colombo, Sri Lanka
Harold Diamond (1926–1982), American art dealer
Harold Ely (1909–1983), American football player
Harold Faltermeyer (born 1952), German musician
Harold H. Fisher, (1901–2005), American church architect 
Harold Ford, Jr., U.S. Congressman, candidate for U.S. Senate
Harold Frost (1921–2004), American orthopedist and surgeon
Harold Goldsmith (1930–2004), American fencer
Harold Hart (born 1952), American football player
Harold Helgeson (1931–2007), American geochemist
Harold Herath (1930–2007), Sri Lanka Minister of Foreign Affairs from 1991-1993
Hal Holbrook (born 1925), American actor
Harold Holt, Australian Prime Minister
Harold Holt (impresario), South African-English impresario
Harold Houser, American admiral and 35th Governor of American Samoa
Hal Jeffcoat (1924–2007), American baseball player
Harold George Jeffcoat (born 1947), American academic
Harold A. Jerry, Jr. (1920–2001), New York politician
Harold Keller (1921–1979), American Marine and Iwo Jima flag raiser
Harold La Borde, Trinidadian circumnavigator
Harold Landry (born 1996), American football player
Hal Lindsey (born 1929), American evangelist and Christian writer
Harold Lloyd, American film actor
Harold C. Luther (1915–1973), New York politician
Harold MacMichael (1882–1969), British Colonial administrator
Harold Macmillan, Prime Minister of Great Britain
Harold McCartney, English rugby player
Harold James Nicholson, former Central Intelligence Agency (CIA) officer and a twice-convicted spy for Russia's Foreign Intelligence Service (SVR)
Harold Nicolson, British diplomat, author, diarist, and politician
Harold Norse, American poet
Harold I. Panken (1910–1999), New York state senator
Harold Peiris (1904–1988), Sri Lankan Sinhala lawyer, author, scholar, teacher, and philanthropist
Harold Perrineau, American actor
Harold Pinter (1930–2008), British playwright
Harold Prince (born 1928), American theatrical producer and director
Harold Ramis (1944–2014), American film actor, director, writer and producer
Harold Reynolds (disambiguation), multiple people
Harold S. Roise (1916–1991), American Marine officer, double Navy Cross recipient
Harold G. Schrier (1916–1971), American Marine officer and Iwo Jima flag raiser
Harold Schultz (1925–1995), American Marine and Iwo Jima flag raiser
Harold Shipman (1946-2004), British general practitioner and serial killer
Harold Solomon (born 1952), American tennis player
Hal Steinbrenner (born 1969), principal owner, managing general partner and co-chairman of the New York Yankees baseball franchise
Harold Syrett (1913–1984), American executive editor of The Papers of Alexander Hamilton, and president of Brooklyn College
J. E. Harold Terry, English novelist, playwright, actor and critic
Harold Tucker, Lord Mayor of Manchester, England, from 1984–1985
Harold I. Tyler (1901–1967), New York assemblyman
Harold R. Tyler, Jr. (1922–2005), federal judge in New York
Harold Urey (1893–1981), American physical chemist
Hal B. Wallis (1898–1986), American film producer
Harold Walker (disambiguation), several people
Harold Washington, first African-American mayor of Chicago
Harold Weed, digital artist 
Harold E. Weeks, American politician
Harold Wellman (1909–1999), New Zealand geologist 
Harold Wilson, British Prime Minister
Harold G. Wren (1921–2016), American dean of three law schools
Harold "Butch" Wynegar (born 1956), baseball player
Harold Zent (1900–1951), member of the Washington House of Representatives

Fictional characters
Harold the Helicopter, a character from the British television series Thomas and Friends
Healthy Harold, an Australian Giraffe sock puppet early educating Australian primary school children 
Harold Allnut, from the Batman comic series
Harold Berman, from the Nickelodeon animated series Hey Arnold!
Harold Bishop, from the Australian soap opera Neighbours
Harold Buttowski, from the Disney XD animated series Kick Buttowski: Suburban Daredevil
Harold Chasen, from the film American black-comedy and drama Harold and Maude
Harold Finch (Person of Interest), a main character from the television drama Person of Interest
Harold Foster, a multibillionaire Australian newspaper company chairman from Anthony Horowitz's Power of Five series
Harold Green, Red Green's nephew on The Red Green Show
Harold Hill, from the musical and movie The Music Man
Harold Hutchins, a main character in the Captain Underpants book series
Harold "Hal" Jordan, a fictional DC Comics superhero known as Green Lantern
Harold Lauder, from Stephen King's The Stand
Harold Lee, from American film series Harold & Kumar
Harold "Happy" Loman, from the American stage play Death of a Salesman
Harold McBride, a supporting character from the animated series The Loud House
Harold Saxon, an alias of The Master from the British science-fiction series Doctor Who
Harold Smith, from the 1990s television drama Twin Peaks
Harold SquarePants, SpongeBob's father and Margaret’s husband from American television series SpongeBob SquarePants
Harold Norbert Cheever Doris McGrady V, from the Canadian animated series Total Drama
Harold, from the Cartoon Network animated series The Grim Adventures of Billy & Mandy
Harold, from the British television series Thomas & Friends
Harold, from the animated musical All Dogs Go to Heaven
Harold, a character played by Bill Murray in the 1993 crime comedy-drama film Mad Dog and Glory
Harold and the Purple Crayon from the children's books by Crockett Johnson
Hide the Pain Harold, a fictional identity in meme images based on photos of Hungarian engineer András Arató
King Harold of Far Far Away, from the films Shrek 2 (2004) and Shrek the Third (2007)
Childe Harold, from the Byron poem Childe Harold's Pilgrimage

See also
 Darold
 Harald (disambiguation) 
 Hal (given name)
 Harry (given name)

References

Danish masculine given names
English masculine given names
Irish masculine given names
Scottish masculine given names
Welsh masculine given names
French masculine given names
German masculine given names
Norwegian masculine given names
Swedish masculine given names